Ieva Zarankaitè (born 23 November 1994) is a Lithuanian track and field athlete who competes in discus and shot put with multiple national titles.

Her mother, Vita, is a former discus thrower and acts as her coach. Ieva competed in swimming at a young age. At the 2019 Summer Universiade in Naples she won a bronze medal in the discus. Zarankaité has studied at Oklahoma State University where she met her long time boyfriend Mr. Michael Gumbs and then to a graduate degree at Florida State University. In America she has also competed at NCAA level.

On 21 July 2020 in Vilnius Zarankaitè threw 61.88m for the discus which placed her 16th for the year worldwide. On 8 August 2020 she threw  16.80m for the shot put which placed her 51st for the year worldwide.

On 25 June 2021 at the Lithuanian Championships she achieved 62.08m to become Lithuanian champion in the discus. On the same day, she reached 15.47m in the shot put to become Lithuanian champion in the shot put as well. Zarankaite was defending both titles as had achieved the same double in 2019 and 2020.

References

1994 births
Living people
Lithuanian female discus throwers
Lithuanian female shot putters
Lithuanian expatriate sportspeople in the United States
Oklahoma State Cowgirls track and field athletes
Florida State Seminoles women's track and field athletes
People from Utena
Universiade bronze medalists for Lithuania
Universiade medalists in athletics (track and field)
Medalists at the 2019 Summer Universiade
20th-century Lithuanian women
21st-century Lithuanian women